Holly is the debut album from Canadian singer-songwriter Justin Nozuka. The album was named after his mother Holly. It was first released on March 19, 2007 in the United Kingdom and April 3, 2007 in Canada. It was then released in the United States on April 15, 2008 by Glassnote Records, peaking at numbers six and 30 on the Billboard Top Heatseekers and Independent Albums charts respectively. To promote the album, Nozuka toured across North America with appearances at talk shows.

Promotion
On February 6, 2008 Nozuka announced an 18-city cross-Canada tour with fellow Canadian singer-songwriter Hayley Sales, beginning at Nanaimo, BC's Queen's Hotel and finishing at Toronto's Phoenix Concert Theatre.

On August 14, he announced his first U.S. headlining tour with American rock group the Gabe Dixon Band, beginning at Buffalo's Town Ballroom and finishing at San Francisco's Great American Music Hall. He made his U.S. television debut by appearing on the talk shows Jimmy Kimmel Live! and Good Morning America.

Critical reception

Jo-Ann Greene of AllMusic praised the album for the different facets of love it explores, Nozuka's songwriting and vocal performance, and arrangements in various genres, calling it, "A stunning debut, whose lyrics and atmospheres linger on long after the last (hidden) track has played." Jamie Fisher of BBC Music also echoed Greene's review, praising Nozuka's mature (despite his age) storytelling and singing voice, and choice in vocal notes, concluding "[it's] a superb album, filled with raw quality. Just enjoy."

Track listings
Standard track list

Japanese track list

DVD
"After Tonight" (music video)
"I'm in Peace" (acoustic studio video)
Interview

Personnel
Adapted from the Holly media notes.

Musicians

 Bill Bell – acoustic guitar, atmosphere guitar, B3 organ ("I'm in Peace"), bass, electric slide ("Mr. Therapy Man"), handclaps, marxophone, percussion, piano, snaps, ukulele ("Mr. Therapy Man")
 Pete Cugno – piano ("If I Gave You My Life")
 Davide Direnzo – drums, percussion
 Damhnait Doyle – vocals ("If I Gave You My Life")
 Kevin Fox – cello ("Golden Train", "Oh Momma")
 George Koller – bass, upright bass ("Mr. Therapy Man", "Supposed to Grow Old", "If I Gave You My Life")
 Justin Nozuka – acoustic guitar, handclaps, snaps, vocals

Production
 Jeff McCullough – recording at Wellesley Sound Studio
 Bill Bell – producing, mixing, additional recording at Soleil Studio
 Phil Demetro – mastering

Artwork
 Filip Matovina – cover art
 Krystina Kavanagh – layout
 Andrew Whitton – photo credit

Chart performance

Release history

References

2007 debut albums
Justin Nozuka albums
Outcaste Records albums
Glassnote Records albums